The Estéron is a river that flows through the Alpes-de-Haute-Provence and Alpes-Maritimes departments of southeastern France. Its source is near Soleilhas. It flows generally east, through Roquestéron, and flows into the Var in Saint-Martin-du-Var. The Bouyon and the Rioulan are its tributaries.

References

Rivers of France
Rivers of Alpes-Maritimes
Rivers of Alpes-de-Haute-Provence
Rivers of Provence-Alpes-Côte d'Azur